Non-Stop Production is a major  Russian motion pictures studio founded in 2005 by Sergey Melkumov, a Russian film producer. The company produces movies and TV-series.

Filmography

References

External links 
 Non-Stop Production

Russian film studios
Film production companies of Russia
Companies based in Moscow